Basut or Besut, also rendered as Basot or Bast, may refer to:
 Basut-e Bala
 Basut-e Hajji Hasan